Zackary Arthur (born September 12, 2006) is an American actor, known for portraying the lead role of Jake Wheeler in Chucky, a television continuation of the Child's Play film franchise, for which he was nominated for the Saturn Award for Best Performance by a Younger Actor in a Network or Cable Television Series. He also played Sammy Sullivan in The 5th Wave, and had a recurring role as a young Jeff Piccirillo on the Showtime series Kidding.

Career
Arthur made his acting debut in 2014 playing Zack Novak in the Amazon Studios' comedy-drama series Transparent along with Jeffrey Tambor.

Arthur played one of the lead roles, Sammy Sullivan, in the film The 5th Wave (2016), along with Chloë Grace Moretz and Nick Robinson, and directed by J Blakeson. He was one of hundreds of young actors who auditioned for the role. The film was released on January 22, 2016, by Columbia Pictures.

He also played a role in the CBS comedy pilot The Half of It in 2015, and appeared in the Grey's Anatomy episode, "Trigger Happy", as a small boy possibly at fault for the paralysis of his friend in 2016.

In 2017, he starred as Josh Ryan in the horror comedy film Mom and Dad. In 2021, he was cast in the television series Chucky as the show's main protagonist, Jake Wheeler.
The show was renewed for a second season and aired in October 5, 2022.

Filmography

Film

Television

References

External links
 

2006 births
Living people
Male actors from Los Angeles
American male child actors
American male film actors
American male television actors
21st-century American male actors